Micracanthia is a genus of shore bugs in the family Saldidae. There are about 15 described species in Micracanthia.

Species
These 15 species belong to the genus Micracanthia:

 Micracanthia bergrothi (Jakovlev, 1893)
 Micracanthia drakei Cobben, 1960
 Micracanthia fennica (Reuter, 1884)
 Micracanthia floridana Drake & Chapman, 1953
 Micracanthia hodgdeni Drake, 1955
 Micracanthia humilis (Say, 1832)
 Micracanthia hungerfordi (Hodgden, 1949)
 Micracanthia husseyi Drake & Chapman, 1952
 Micracanthia marginalis (Fallén, 1807)
 Micracanthia ornatula (Reuter, 1881)
 Micracanthia peruviana Cobben, 1986
 Micracanthia pumpila Blatchley, 1928
 Micracanthia quadrimaculata (Champion, 1900)
 Micracanthia schuhi Lattin, 1968
 Micracanthia utahensis Drake & Hottes, 1955

References

Further reading

External links

 

Articles created by Qbugbot
Heteroptera genera
Saldidae